Manuel Antonio Valarezo Luzuriaga (born June 7, 1937), is an Ecuadorian Roman Catholic cleric and Professor Emeritus Apostolic Vicar of the Apostolic Vicariate of Galápagos in Ecuador.

He was born in the rural parish of Zaruma, (Loja Malvas Province) Ecuador, and was ordained a priest on August 11, 1962.   

He had studied communication science, and held various offices in the pastoral care and administration branches of the church including two mandates as provincial Minister of the Franciscan Friars Minor in Venezuela and Peru.

He was appointed 22 Jun 1990 53.0 Appointed Prefect of the Galápagos, Ecuador on June 22, 1990 and Vicar Apostolic of Galápagos in 2008, a position he resigned on 29 October 2013.

On April 22, 1996 he was appointed by Pope John Paul II as the titular bishop of Quaestoriana.

References

Living people
21st-century Roman Catholic archbishops in Ecuador
1937 births
Roman Catholic bishops of Galápagos